List of retired BC Ferries:

Retired ferries
Since the 1960s, BC Ferries has retired the following ferries:

Planned retirement

BC Ferries has plans to retire Queen of New Westminster, Queen of Alberni, Queen of Coquitlam, Queen of Cowichan, Queen of Oak Bay, and Queen of Surrey starting in 2024. New vessels are planned to be announced and enter service in the coming years.

See also
 
 
 
 
 
 British Columbia K-class ferry

References

External links
 BC Ferries Milestone
 Black Ball ferries of Puget Sound transferred to British Columbia waters in the 1950s (Group 1)
 Black Ball ferries of Puget Sound transferred to British Columbia waters in the 1950s (Group 2)
 Ships of the BC Ferries fleet

 
BC Ferries retired
BC Ferries retired
BC Ferries retired